The following is a list of firearms used by police forces in Canada. The vast majority of firearms used by Canadian police are semi-automatic.

Federal Police

Provincial Police

Regional and Municipal Police

Railway Police

Defunct Police

References

Police weapons
Law enforcement in Canada
Law enforcement-related lists
|}